The name Koryn has been used for two tropical cyclones in the northwest Pacific Ocean.

 Typhoon Koryn (1990) (T9001, 01W)
 Typhoon Koryn (1993) (T9302, 06W) – struck the Philippines and China.

Pacific typhoon set index articles